The Progressive Party of Saskatchewan was a provincial section of the Progressive Party of Canada and was active from the 1920s to the mid-1930s. The Progressives were an agrarian, social democratic political movement. It was originally dedicated to political and economic reform; it also challenged economic policies that favoured the financial and industrial interests in Central Canada over agrarian (and, to some extent, labour) interests. Like its federal counterpart it favoured free trade over protectionism.

The Progressive movement in Saskatchewan
Despite the dominance of agriculture in Saskatchewan, the Progressive Party of Saskatchewan was never able to match the success it and the United Farmers movement had in other provinces such as Alberta, where the United Farmers of Alberta took power, Manitoba, where the Progressive Party of Manitoba was able to form government, or even Ontario, where the United Farmers of Ontario took power in 1919.

This was largely because while in other provinces farmers organizations were increasingly alienated from mainline political parties, in Saskatchewan the ruling Saskatchewan Liberal Party had made an extra effort to ally itself with farmers interests and worked closely with the Saskatchewan Grain Growers Association which, in turn, resisted efforts to create a farmers' political party in the province.

Electoral participation
The Progressives ran seven candidates and elected six members to the Saskatchewan legislature in the 1921 general election despite the absence of a provincial organization due to the reluctance of the Saskatchewan Grain Growers Association to break with the Saskatchewan Liberal Party.

The Liberals had a tradition of consulting the SGGA about farm policy and of appointing prominent farm activists to cabinet such as Charles Dunning and John Maharg. A political crisis ensued the Liberal government in late 1921 in which Premier William Melville Martin angered the SGGA by campaigning for the federal Liberal Party of Canada against the Progressive Party of Canada in the 1921 federal election. Agriculture Minister Maharg, a former SGGA president, resigned from the Cabinet in protest and crossed the floor to sit as an Independent and become Leader of the Opposition. Martin himself was forced to step down and the federal Progressives won 15 of 16 Saskatchewan seats in the federal election.

The SGGA subsequently authorized the creation of local political action committees across the province but were unable to build on the 1921 federal breakthrough and only ran 6 of a possible 63 candidates in the next two provincial elections. Despite its initial anger at the Liberals, the SGGA did not sustain its commitment to independent political action, particularly after the Premier Martin, the SGGA's antagonist, stepped down in 1922 and was replaced as Liberal leader and Premier by Charles Avery Dunning, a former activist with the SGGA who had been managing director of the Saskatchewan Co-operative Elevator Company. Dunning was able to regain the confidence of the official farmers movement and re-establish the Liberal Party's credentials as a farmer's party and in 1924 the SGGA decided to withdrawal from electoral politics.

Nevertheless, in the 1925 provincial election the Progressive Party increased its share of the vote from 7.5% to over 23%, but failed to add to its six member caucus. However it formed the official opposition due to the poor standing of the Saskatchewan Conservative Party.

Coalition government
The Progressives were reduced to third party status and five seats in the 1929 provincial election with the Liberals reduced to minority government status due to a strong showing by a revived Conservative Party. The Progressives joined with the Conservatives to force the Liberals from office on September 6, 1929 through a motion of non-confidence and then formed a coalition government allowing the Conservatives leader James T.M. Anderson to take power as premier; one Progressive, Reginald Stipe, was appointed to Anderson's cabinet as minister without portfolio. By the next election the Progressives had disappeared.

Collapse of the Progressives and emergence of a new farmer's party
While the Progressives moved to the right, farmers radicalized and moved to the left due to the crisis of the Great Depression. The SGGA had amalgamated with the Farmers' Union of Canada to form the United Farmers of Canada (Saskatchewan Section) in 1926. As a result of the Dust Bowl farm crisis during the Great Depression the UFC (SS) became politicised and adopted a socialist platform. In 1930, in response to the Progressive-Conservative coalition, the UFC (SS) under the leadership of George Hara Williams decided to form a new political party. The Progressives disbanded as a result. In 1932, Williams' party joined  with the Independent Labour Party in the province to form the Farmer-Labour Group. Progressive MLA Jacob Benson joined the new party to become its first MLA while Charles Agar joined the opposition Liberals. Other Progressive MLAs either joined the Conservative Party or left politics. In the 1934 provincial election, the FLG returned five MLAs to the legislature and subsequently became the Saskatchewan section of the Cooperative Commonwealth Federation.

References

Agrarian parties in Canada
Defunct agrarian political parties
Defunct political parties in Canada
Provincial political parties in Saskatchewan
Social democratic parties in Canada
United Farmers